Mothman is a legendary creature reportedly seen in Point Pleasant, West Virginia.

Mothman may also refer to:

 Mothman (film), a 2010 television film by Syfy
 The Mothman of Point Pleasant, a 2017 documentary film
 The Mothman Prophecies, a 1975 book by John Keel, focusing on sightings of the Mothman
 The Mothman Prophecies (film), a 2002 film adapted from John Keel's book
 Mothman, a fictional character from the Watchmen comic books
 Mothmonsterman, a recurring Aqua Teen Hunger Force character

See also
 Mothra